was a Japanese economist and professor at the Tokyo University of Commerce (now Hitotsubashi University) who was a pioneer of mathematical economics in Japan. He participated in the Tokuzō Fukuda Seminar, and majored in Marxist economics at the Tokyo University of Commerce and went on to study in Germany before returning to Japan.

References

1901 births
1952 deaths
Hitotsubashi University alumni
20th-century  Japanese economists